Trevethin is a suburb of Pontypool and a community
in Torfaen, Wales. It includes two electoral wards (Trevethin and St Cadocs and Penygarn) for Torfaen County Borough Council. It is in the historic county of Monmouthshire.

History and amenities
Trevethin was a small village that was the seat of the parish of Trevethin in ancient Abergavenny Hundred. It has become a modern suburb, as economic growth led to a construction boom surrounding the village in the 1960s and '70s. Today Trevethin almost imperceptibly merges with nearby Penygarn. In 2005 it was announced that the district's local school, Trevethin Community School, was to close. Pupils were moved to Abersychan comprehensive school and West Monmouth School. The school buildings have now been demolished. Ysgol Gyfun Gwynllyw is a Welsh-medium education secondary school located in Trevethin.

Trevethin is situated in Pontypool and is on the southernmost point of the Brecon Beacons National Park. Near to Trevethin are various famous landmarks including the Folly Tower and Shell Grotto both of which were originally built by the Hanbury family during the 18th century.

Trevethin has been awarded Communities First status and has a strong partnership board.

Notable people
Morgan Edwards
Megan Hicks
Nathan ph.
Aaron King

Football club
Trevethin have a football team, who play in Division Two of the Gwent Central League. They play their home games at top pitch in Trevethin.

External links
: Trevethin's new Nextdoor network of neighbours 
: Read about Nextdoor here
www.geograph.co.uk : photos of Trevethin and surrounding area
Trevethin on Genuki

References

Suburbs of Pontypool
Communities in Torfaen
Electoral wards of Torfaen
Villages in Torfaen